Laguna San Raphael Airport  is an airport serving Laguna San Rafael National Park in the Aysén Region of Chile. The runway is near the shore of San Rafael Lake.

See also

Transport in Chile
List of airports in Chile

References

External links
OpenStreetMap - Laguna San Rafael
OurAirports - Laguna San Rafael
SkyVector - Laguna San Rafael

Airports in Aysén Region